Catch Me a Colobus is a television series narrated by Gerald Durrell, the well-known British naturalist and writer, which was shown on BBC children's television around 1967.

It described an expedition to Sierra Leone to catch colobus monkeys for Durrell's zoo in Jersey.

Durrell also wrote a 1972 book of the same name.

Nature educational television series
Gerald Durrell
Television series about animals
BBC Television shows